Microchloa, or smallgrass, is a genus of tropical and subtropical plants in the grass family, native to Africa, southern Asia, northern Australia, and the warmer parts of the Western Hemisphere.

 Species
 Microchloa altera (Rendle) Stapf - central + southern Africa
 Microchloa annua (Kupicha & Cope) Cope - Zambia
 Microchloa caffra Nees - central + southern Africa
 Microchloa ensifolia Rendle - Angola
 Microchloa indica (L.f.) P.Beauv. - tropical Africa, southern China, Indian subcontinent, Indochina, Java, Philippines, Northern Territory of Australia
 Microchloa kunthii Desv. - Africa, southern Asia (Yemen to Vietnam), southwestern USA (Arizona, Texas), Mexico, Central America, South America (Argentina, Chile, Bolivia, Peru, Ecuador, Colombia)

 formerly included
see Brachyachne

References

 Grassbase - The World Online Grass Flora

Chloridoideae
Poaceae genera